Naked Souls is a 1996 erotic thriller film starring Brian Krause and Pamela Anderson. It was written by Frank Dietz and directed by Lyndon Chubbuck.

While Pamela Anderson plays only a small role in the plot, much of the advertising and even the film' tagline ("She's about to bare her soul... and all that goes with it") is focused on her.

Plot

Edward, a scientist doing research in an attempt to read and record people's thoughts, has a relationship with his artist girlfriend Britt. The extensive time he puts into his research leaves him little time for his relationship with Britt. Just as Edward is about to give up on his research, he is contacted by the mysterious Everett Longstreet who offers Edward both a place to do his research and unlimited funding. As Edward gets closer to making a breakthrough with his research he becomes suspicious of Everett and his ulterior motives as he realizes that he is getting closer to not only unlocking the mind but also the secrets of eternal death.

Cast
 Brian Krause as Edward
 Pamela Anderson as Britt
 David Warner as Everett Longstreet
 Dean Stockwell as Duncan
 Clayton Rohner as Jerry
 Justina Vail as Amelia
 Michael Papajohn as Driver

External links
 
 

1996 films
1996 horror films
American independent films
1990s English-language films
1990s American films